Moro National Liberation Front may refer to:

Moro National Liberation Front (Misuari faction) - led by Nur Misuari and his right-hand man Habier Malik. Also known as:
MNLF-NM (Moro National Liberation Front-Nur Misuari)
MNLF-BG (Moro National Liberation Front-Breakaway Group)
MNLF-HM (Moro National Liberation Front-Habier Malik)
Islamic Command Council - led by Habib Mujahab Hashim.
Moro National Liberation Front (Sema faction) - led by Muslimin Sema.
Moro National Liberation Front (Alonto faction) - led by Abul Khayr Alonto.